"Justify" is the second single released from the 2008 album, Black Roses by the Finnish rock band, the Rasmus.

The song is a symphonic rock song (pehmorock or "plush rock" in Finnish.) The first demo for "Justify" was created in Los Angeles, California at both James Michael's and Desmond Child's studios in January 2007.

Track list

 "Justify"
 "Yesterday You Threw Away Tomorrow"
 "Justify (Brown Version)" (iTunes Bonus)

Video 

The music video for the single was filmed on November 9, 2008. It begins with lead singer Lauri Ylönen confined to a chair. He starts to cry tears of black ink, which gradually flood the room throughout the video and seemingly drown him.

Charts

References

External links 
 
 Justify video (youtube)

2009 singles
The Rasmus songs
Songs written by Desmond Child
Songs written by Lauri Ylönen
Songs written by James Michael
Song recordings produced by Desmond Child
2008 songs
Songs written by Pauli Rantasalmi
Playground Music Scandinavia singles